Nasusina inferior is a moth in the family Geometridae. It is found in southern California.

The wingspan is about 18 mm and the length of the forewings is 9–10 mm. The forewings are light smoky brown with numerous fine lines. The hindwings are slightly paler than the forewings. They are marked by several darker lines and bands. Adults are on wing from March to June.

References

Moths described in 1896
Eupitheciini